Mattakkuliya is a suburb in Colombo, Sri Lanka. It is part of an area referred to as Colombo 15.

Schools

 Razik Fareed Muslim Vidyalaya
 Northshore College of Business and Technology.

Places of worship

 Zaviyathul Khairiyya Jumu'ah Masjidh
 St. Mary's Church
 Al Masjidhul Dheeniya
 Sri Kalyani Ganagarama Temple
 New Apostolic Church
 Al Masjidhul Ilahiya
 Open Heaven Life Church
 St. John's Church 
 Methodist Church

References

Mattakkuliya

Populated places in Western Province, Sri Lanka